Egon Gustav Adolf Zill (28 March 1906 in Plauen – 23 October 1974 in Dachau) was a German Schutzstaffel (SS) Sturmbannführer and concentration camp commandant.

Zill was born in Plauen. The son of a brewer from Plauen, Zill's father was severely injured in the First World War and as such Zill was apprenticed to a baker at an early age in order to bring in much needed money to the family. As a 17-year-old Zill enlisted in both the Nazi Party and the Sturmabteilung (SA), switching to the SS as soon as it came to his hometown (in fact Zill was the 535 member of the SS nationally). Zill would later work as a security guard in a curtain factory and it was not until 1934 that he became a full-time SS man, serving as a guard at a minor concentration camp at Chemnitz.

From this low beginning Zill began to rise through the ranks at the camps. His first appointment at a major camp was at Lichtenburg where he, along with fellow future commandant Arthur Rödl, guarded the camp borders. He moved between camps, seeing service at Dachau, Ravensbrück and Hinzert in various capacities. His first commandant role was at Natzweiler-Struthof before taking charge at Flossenbürg. As a commandant Zill expected his guards to act with the discipline of soldiers whilst also supporting the idea that camp inmates who had been indoctrinated into Nazism should be allowed to fight for Nazi Germany in return for their freedom. His regime as a commandant was also marked by extreme cruelty and according to the testimonies of inmates Zill's crimes included tying prisoners to trees before allowing his dogs to savage their genitalia. Zill was replaced in April 1943 by Max Koegel after being judged ineffective as a commandant. The move followed letters of complaint to Fritz Sauckel from the villagers about the high standards of living enjoyed by camp guards and their wives in contrast to the impoverished standards in the village, as well as a culture of corruption amongst the guards. He was transferred to the Eastern Front in 1943.

Nicknamed "Little Zill" because of his short stature he went underground after the Second World War, but revealed himself when he put his real name on the birth certificate of an illegitimate child. Sentenced to life imprisonment by a Munich court the sentence was reduced on appeal to fifteen years in 1955. Following his release Zill settled in Dachau where he died in 1974.

References

Bibliography

1906 births
1974 deaths
People from Plauen
Nazi Party politicians
Dachau concentration camp personnel
Flossenbürg concentration camp personnel
Ravensbrück concentration camp personnel
SS-Sturmbannführer
Nazi concentration camp commandants
People from the Kingdom of Saxony
Hinzert concentration camp personnel
Waffen-SS personnel
Schutzhaftlagerführer
Lichtenburg concentration camp personnel
German people convicted of murder
German prisoners sentenced to life imprisonment
People convicted of murder by Germany
Prisoners sentenced to life imprisonment by Germany